Lovefully Yours Veda is a 2023 Indian Malayalam-language romance drama thriller  film directed by Praghesh Sukumaran and jointly produced by Radhakrishnan Khalayil and Ruvin Viswam through R2 Entertainments, with a screenplay by Babu Vayalathur. The film stars Rajisha Vijayan, Gautham Vasudev Menon, Sreenath Bhasi, Anikha Surendran, Venkitesh V.P, Chandhunadh and Appani Sarath. The film was co-produced by Abdul Salim. The plot follows a mix of campus romance and political drama set in the 90s.

The original background score and songs are composed by Rahul Raj. Principal photography began in January 2022. Lovefully Yours Veda is all set to release this February.

Plot
Maalu, a member of the musical band Banjara’s, chances upon a poem on the walls of Varma College, Thrissur. The band reworks it into a song and it becomes a big hit in no time. People get curious about the lyricist and the band has no clue about the author of the poem. The band embarks on a journey to discover the poet and reaches Varma College. They come to know about Sree Veda, a former student of the college and the poet in question. 

The youngsters meet Veda and she reminisces about the story behind the poem, her eventful college life, and Comrade Jeevanlal, the charming man who revolutionized her world.

Cast

Production

Filming
The makers started the principal photography on 16 December 2021 with the switch-on ceremony. It took 62 days in 4 schedules to complete the shoot. The post-production of the film started in October 2022 and Rajisha Vijayan herself announced the release date when the promotions for the film were ongoing.

Music
The original background score and songs are composed by Rahul Raj. The music rights were bagged by Sony Music.

The first single Aakaasha Paalazhiyil was released on Sony Music and it crossed more than 1 million views in a short span.

References

External links
 

2023 films
2023 drama films
2020s Malayalam-language films
Indian political drama films
Indian romantic drama films